Stefan Lulchev (27 April 1971-22 May 2017) was a Bulgarian footballer who played as a defender. On 22 May 2017 he committed suicide by hanging himself.

Career
A product of the Loko Plovdiv youth system, Lulchev spent his entire career in his country, mainly playing for top division clubs. He became champion of Bulgaria with CSKA Sofia in 1997 and also won a Bulgarian Cup (1999). He was in addition to that part of the Loko Plovdiv and CSKA Sofia teams that posted third-place finishes in the league (in 1992 and 1998 respectively).

Honours

Club
CSKA Sofia
 A Group: 1996–97
 Bulgarian Cup: 1999

References

1971 births
Bulgarian footballers
Association football defenders
PFC Lokomotiv Plovdiv players
FC Chernomorets Burgas players
PFC CSKA Sofia players
FC Septemvri Sofia players
PFC Marek Dupnitsa players
Botev Plovdiv players
First Professional Football League (Bulgaria) players
Suicides in Bulgaria
Suicides by hanging
2017 suicides